RMS Leinster was an Irish ship operated by the City of Dublin Steam Packet Company. She served as the Kingstown-Holyhead mailboat until she was torpedoed and sunk by the German submarine , which was under the command of Oberleutnant zur See Robert Ramm, on 10 October 1918, while bound for Holyhead.

The exact number of dead is unknown but researchers from the National Maritime Museum believe it was at least 564; this would make it the largest single loss of life in the Irish Sea.

Design
In 1895, the City of Dublin Steam Packet Company ordered four steamers for Royal Mail service, named for four provinces of Ireland: RMS Leinster, RMS , RMS Munster, and RMS Ulster. The vessel, which was built at Laird's in Birkenhead, England, was driven by two independent four-cylinder triple-expansion steam engines. During the First World War, the twin-propellered ship was armed with one 12-pounder and two signal guns.

Sinking
The ship's log states that she carried 77 crew and 694 passengers on her final voyage. The ship had previously been attacked in the Irish Sea but the torpedoes missed their target. Those on board included more than 100 British civilians, 22 postal sorters (working in the mail room) and almost 500 military personnel from the Royal Navy, British Army and Royal Air Force. Also aboard were nurses from Great Britain, Ireland, Australia, New Zealand, Canada and the United States.

Just before 10 a.m. as it was sailing east of the Kish Bank in a heavy swell, passengers saw a torpedo approach from the port side and pass in front of the bow. A second torpedo followed shortly afterwards, and struck the ship forward on the port side in the vicinity of the mail room. The ship made a U-turn in an attempt to return to Kingstown as it began to settle slowly by the bow; however, it sank rapidly after a third torpedo struck her, causing a huge explosion.

Despite the heavy seas, the crew managed to launch several lifeboats and some passengers clung to life-rafts. Among the civilian passengers lost in the sinking were socially prominent people such as Lady Phyllis Hamilton, daughter of the Duke of Abercorn, Robert Jocelyn Alexander, son of Irish composer Cecil Frances Alexander, Rev. John Bartley, the Presbyterian minister of Tralee who was travelling to visit his mortally wounded son in hospital, Thomas Foley and his wife Charlotte Foley (née Barrett) who was the brother-in-law of the world-famous Irish tenor John McCormack who adopted their eldest son, and Richard Moore, only son of British architect Temple Moore. The first member of the Women's Royal Naval Service to die on active duty, Josephine Carr, was among those who died, as were two prominent officials of the Irish Transport and General Workers' Union, James McCarron and Patrick Lynch.

Several of the military personnel who died are buried in Grangegorman Military Cemetery.

Survivors were brought to Kingstown harbour.

One of the rescue ships was the armed yacht and former fishery protection vessel HMY Helga. Stationed in Kingstown harbour at the time of the sinking, she had shelled Dublin during the 1916 Easter Rising in Dublin two years earlier. She was later bought and renamed the Muirchú by the Irish Free State government as one of its first fishery protection vessels.

The last act
On October 18, 1918 at 9.10 a.m. , outbound from Germany under the command of Oberleutnant zur See Werner Vater, picked up a radio message requesting advice on the best way to get through the North Sea minefield. The sender was Oberleutnant zur See Robert Ramm aboard . Extra mines had been added to the minefield since UB-123 had made her outward voyage from Germany. As UB-125 had just come through the minefield, Vater radioed back with a suggested route. UB-123 acknowledged the message and was never heard from again.

The following day, ten days after the sinking of the RMS Leinster, UB-123 detonated a mine while trying to cross the North Sea and return to base in Imperial Germany. There were no survivors.

Anchor 
In 1991, the anchor of the RMS Leinster was raised by local divers. It was placed near Carlisle Pier and officially dedicated on 28 January 1996.

Commemorations

2008 Commemoration

In 2008, 90 years after its sinking, a commemorative stamp was issued by An Post, recalling particularly the Post Office's 21 staff who died in the tragedy. The sinking of the vessel is further recalled in the postal museum of the General Post Office, in Dublin's O'Connell Street.

2018 Centenary Commemoration

On 10 October 2018 an official commemoration took place in Dún Laoghaire attended by the Minister for Culture, Heritage and the Gaeltacht, Josepha Madigan T.D. in which she confirmed that Leinster is now under the protection of the National Monuments Acts, which covers all shipwrecks over 100 years old.

See also
 Maritime disasters

References

Further reading
 Bourke, Edward J. Shipwrecks of the Irish Coast: 1105–1993, published by the author, Dublin 1994.
 de Courcy Ireland, John "Ireland and the Irish in Maritime History", Glendale Press, Dublin 1986.
 Ferguson, Stephen. Sorting Letters on the Sea: Holyhead mail boats and the Leinster tragedy. An Post, Dublin 2018. 
 Higgins, John (Jack) The Sinking of the R.M.S. Leinster Recalled; article in the Postal Worker (Vol 14, No 11, November 1936), the official publication of the Post Office Workers Union, written by the only survivor from the ship's mailroom.
 Lecane, Philip Torpedoed!: The R.M.S. Leinster Disaster, Published by Periscope Publishing Ltd, Cornwall TR18 2AW, Softback,  Published in Ireland, hardback, 
 Lecane, Philip “Women and Children of the R.M.S Leinster: Restored to History,” Elm Books , Dublin 2018.
 Stokes, Roy Death in the Irish Sea: The Sinking of RMS Leinster, Collins Press, Cork 1998. 
 Liffiton, John L. The Last Passenger Liner Sunk in the Great War. article in the Medals Society of Ireland Journal (No. 49, September 1999).

External links
 RMS Leinster "Home Site"
 video of 90th anniversary
 Irish Wrecks Online
 List of Casualties 

 

Steamships
Ships built on the River Mersey
World War I passenger ships of the United Kingdom
Maritime incidents in Ireland
Maritime incidents in 1918
1918 disasters in the United Kingdom
1918 in Ireland
World War I shipwrecks in the Irish Sea
Ships sunk by German submarines in World War I
1896 ships
Shipwrecks of Ireland